The 2008 season is the 94th season in Palmeiras's existence, and their 93rd in Brazil's first division. They spent 1 season in Campeonato Brasileiro Série B in 2003

Squad

Transfers
For recent transfers, see Brazilian Football Transfers 2008

Statistics
Last updated on 2008-07-07

Season

Campeonato Paulista

Matches

Campeonato Paulista-Semi Final 1st Leg

Campeonato Paulista-Semi Final 2nd Leg

Campeonato Paulista-Final 1st Leg

Campeonato Paulista-Final 2nd Leg

League table

Results summary

Pld = Matches played; W = Matches won; D = Matches drawn; L = Matches lost;

Copa do Brasil

First round

Second round

Round of 16

Campeonato Brasileiro Série A

Matches

Classification

League table

Results summary 

Pld = Matches played; W = Matches won; D = Matches drawn; L = Matches lost;

Results by round

External links
First Squad 
Fixtures and results 
Fixtures and results • UOL.com.br 
Fixtures • Globo.com 

2008
Brazilian football clubs 2008 season